James F. Quinn (September 9, 1906 – July 12, 2004) was an American athlete, winner of gold medal in 4 × 100 m relay at the 1928 Summer Olympics.

As a student of College of the Holy Cross, James Quinn won the IC4A  title in 1928.

At the Olympic Games in Amsterdam, Quinn ran the second leg in the American 4 × 100 m relay team, which won the gold medal with a world record of 41.0.

James Quinn died in Cranston, Rhode Island, aged 97.

References

1906 births
2004 deaths
American male sprinters
Athletes (track and field) at the 1928 Summer Olympics
Olympic gold medalists for the United States in track and field
College of the Holy Cross alumni
Medalists at the 1928 Summer Olympics